Pinvin is a village in Worcestershire, England, a little to the north of Pershore, about  south-east of Worcester, and about  north-west of Evesham and lies on the crossroads of the A44, A4104 and B4082. It is also the location of Pershore railway station. The village has a church and a pub. It also has a first school (rated Good by Ofsted) and a middle school (rated Inadequate by Ofsted); pre-school activities take place in the village hall.

The name is thought to come from 'Penda's fen' after the Mercian King Penda, who was probably born in the nearby Cotswolds. David Rudkin's TV play Penda's Fen (1974) was set here and also references this fact.

References

External links 

 Pinvin Parish Council

Villages in Worcestershire